Versiones is the eleventh studio album by Peruvian singer-songwriter Gian Marco released by 11 y 6 Discos in 2013.  The album includes several covers of classic songs in Spanish, Portuguese, and one in English. It was his first album to include a song recorded in English.

Commercial performance
The album had great success throughout Latin America, entered the Billboard Jazz Albums charts, and was certified gold in Perú. The album was nominated  for Album of the Year at the 2013 Latin Grammy Awards. The song "La Vida Nos Espera" received a nomination for instrumental arrangement at the 2014 Grammy Awards.

Track listing

Charts

Certifications and sales

Accolades
14th Latin Grammy Awards

|-
|2013
|style="text-align:center;"|Versiones
|style="text-align:center;"|Album of the Year
|
|}

References

Gian Marco albums
2013 albums
Spanish-language albums
Covers albums